Blue Devils Football Club (formerly known as Oakville Blue Devils FC) is a semi-professional soccer club based in Oakville, Ontario. The senior men's and women's teams currently compete in League1 Ontario men's and women's divisions.

History

Past teams of same name

The original Oakville Blue Devils was a member team of the Oakville Soccer Club. The team was built, coached and developed by Phil Iafrati (1947–2013), where they won the U19 provincial and national championships in 1998. As the Devils reached the end of the youth soccer circuit that season, Iafrati restarted the program with the a U9 program Oakville Blue Stars in 1999.

In 2005, the second edition of the Blue Devils were formed when the Scarborough-based Metro Lions of the Canadian Professional Soccer League relocated to Oakville and adopted the Blue Devils name, coached by Duncan Wilde. They won the 2005 season defeating Vaughan Shooters in the final. In 2006, Wilde left to manage the Toronto Lynx, which resulted in a mass exodus of players not returning.  The club was relocated in 2007 and became Brampton United, bringing to an end the period of the Oakville Blue Devils history.

Revival

In 2015, the club was founded to play in the semi-professional League1 Ontario, named after the original team from prior years. The Toronto Lynx men's senior team was incorporated into the Oakville team and in late 2017, the teams merged completely under Oakville's umbrella. In their inaugural L1O season, they were crowned league champions and qualified for the Inter-Provincial Cup against the champion of the Première Ligue de soccer du Québec to determine the Canadian Division III champion, where they defeated CS Mont-Royal Outremont to win the title. In 2017, they won their second title, defeating Woodbridge Strikers in the Championship final on penalty kicks. 

In 2018, the team played in the Canadian Championship for the first time where they lost in the first qualifying round against 2017 PLSQ champion AS Blainville. Later, during the 2018 season, they played a friendly against Italian professional Serie A club Frosinone Calcio, losing by a score of 2–0.

Also in 2018, the club added a team in the women's division of League1 Ontario, beginning in the 2018 season. In their second season, the women advanced to the Championship Final, where they were defeated by FC London. In 2021, the women once again finished as runner-ups after being defeated in the finals by the Woodbridge Strikers.

In 2020, the club merged with GPS Academy and was renamed to Blue Devils FC. The men finished as runner-ups in both 2021 and 2022, being defeated in the Championship Finals by Guelph United FC and Vaughan Azzurri, respectively.

Front office and technical Staff

Seasons

Honours 
League1 Ontario Championship: 2015, 2017
Inter-Provincial Cup: 2015

Notable players
The following players have either played at the professional or international level, either before or after playing for the League1 Ontario team:

Men

Women

References

External links 
 

Association football clubs established in 2015
Soccer clubs in Ontario
League1 Ontario teams
2015 establishments in Ontario
Oakville, Ontario